George Dougan (1891-1955) was a dispensary doctor and MP for Central Armagh in the Parliament of Northern Ireland. Dougan was elected to Stormont on 15 March 1941, replacing David Shillington.

Dougan practiced in Church Street, Portadown where he was a prominent Orangeman.

References 

1891 births
1955 deaths
Ulster Unionist Party members of the House of Commons of Northern Ireland
Members of the House of Commons of Northern Ireland 1938–1945
Members of the House of Commons of Northern Ireland 1945–1949
Members of the House of Commons of Northern Ireland 1949–1953
Members of the House of Commons of Northern Ireland 1953–1958
Members of the House of Commons of Northern Ireland for County Armagh constituencies